Homefield Wood is a  Site of Special Scientific Interest in Hambleden in Buckinghamshire. It is owned by the Forestry Commission, and managed by the Berkshire, Buckinghamshire and Oxfordshire Wildlife Trust. It is part of the Chilterns Area of Outstanding Natural Beauty.

The site has young beech plantations, with some conifers and many native trees. There are rides and glades in some areas which have important and varied herb-rich chalk grassland, with plants such as Chiltern gentian and  upright brome-grass and a variety of orchids. The rich invertebrate fauna includes thirty species of butterfly and over four hundred of moth.

There is access from a road between Bockmer End and Lower Woodend.

References

Sites of Special Scientific Interest in Buckinghamshire
Berkshire, Buckinghamshire and Oxfordshire Wildlife Trust
Forests and woodlands of Buckinghamshire